The albums discography of American country artist Dottie West contains 33 studio albums and 18 compilation albums. Among West's studio releases were five collaborative albums with various artists, including Kenny Rogers. After signing with RCA Victor Records in 1963, West released her debut studio album Here Comes My Baby (1965). The album peaked at number 12 on the Billboard Top Country Albums chart in July 1965. West's third studio album Suffer Time (1966) spawned four singles, including "Would You Hold It Against Me", a top 5 hit on the Billboard Hot Country Songs chart. Suffer Time would reach number 3 on the country albums chart, West's highest-charting solo album. Between 1967 and 1968, West released 5 more studio albums. With All My Heart and Soul (1967) featured the top 10 hit "Paper Mansions" and the album itself peaked at number 8 on the Top Country Albums list. In 1969, she paired with Don Gibson for her first collaborative project Dottie and Don. The album featured the pair's number 2 Billboard country hit "Rings of Gold". In 1970, she collaborated with Jimmy Dean on the studio release Country Boy and Country Girl. In 1973, West had her biggest hit with the single "Country Sunshine". Its corresponding album of the same name peaked at number 17 on the country album chart in February 1974.

After the release of several albums and singles, West collaborated with Kenny Rogers on "Every Time Two Fools Collide" (1978), which reached number 1 on the Billboard Hot Country Singles chart. A collaborative album of the same name peaked at number 1 on the Billboard country albums chart, West's highest-charting album. The pair's second studio album Classics was released in 1979, peaking at number 3 on the country albums chart. West's solo career became more successful during this period. Her solo studio album Special Delivery (1980) reached number 13 on the Billboard country albums survey. Wild West (1981) peaked at number 5 on the country albums chart and number 126 on the Billboard 200. Between 1982 and 1983, West released three more studio albums. In 1984, she issued her final studio album on Permian Records entitled Just Dottie.

Studio albums

As a solo artist

As a collaborative artist

Compilation albums

References

External links 
 Dottie West albums at 45 Cat.com

Country music discographies